Milan Mazáč (born 22 September 1968) is a Slovak wrestler. He competed in the men's freestyle 100 kg at the 1996 Summer Olympics.

References

1968 births
Living people
Slovak male sport wrestlers
Olympic wrestlers of Slovakia
Wrestlers at the 1996 Summer Olympics
Sportspeople from Bratislava